Bomarion boavidai is a species of beetle in the family Cerambycidae. It was described by Martins in 1968.

References

Ectenessini
Beetles described in 1968